Carmarthenshire County Museum is a museum in the old county town of Carmarthen, Carmarthenshire in Wales.

Location 
Carmarthenshire County Museum is located at Abergwili, Carmarthen, SA31 2JG. It is managed by Carmarthenshire County Council.

History 
The museum is housed a building that began life as a college of priests, founded in the 1280s, which then became the palace of the Bishop of St Davids between 1542 and 1974. It was here that the New Testament and the Book of Common Prayer were first translated into the Welsh language in 1567 during the episcopate of Bishop Richard Davies.

Exhibition & Collection 
The museum tells the rich history the county through a diverse collection of artifacts, paintings and portraits. In addition there is a notable collection of Welsh furniture and costume, a Victorian era village schoolroom, articles associated with the county's farming and agricultural heritage and an exhibition on World War II's home front.

References

External links 
 
 Friends of Carmarthenshire County Museum

Decorative arts museums in Wales
Museums in Carmarthenshire
Local museums in Wales
1908 establishments in Wales
Museums established in 1908
Buildings and structures in Carmarthen
Grade II listed buildings in Carmarthenshire